Francisco Manuel Rico Castro (born 3 August 1987) is a Spanish former professional footballer who played as a midfielder.

Formed at Pontevedra, he spent most of his career – riddled with injury problems – at Granada, appearing in 117 competitive matches. In La Liga, he also played with Eibar.

Club career

Pontevedra
Born in Portonovo, Province of Pontevedra, Rico joined local Pontevedra CF's youth ranks at the age of 14, making his senior debut on 18 December 2005 in a Segunda División B match against CD San Isidro.

Mainly a substitute in his first year, he became an important part of the Galicians' squad the following seasons.

Real Madrid
Rico joined Real Madrid in summer 2008, being assigned to the reserve team also in the third division. He made his debut on 31 August, scoring the first goal in a 2–0 win at UD Vecindario. On 14 September, in only his third appearance, against CD Alfaro, he suffered an anterior cruciate ligament injury only eight minutes after the start of the match, being lost for the rest of the campaign.

Thirteen months after his injury, Rico played his first game of the season, against RSD Alcalá. On 8 November 2009, less than one month later, he scored twice in the 4–2 home victory over Gimnástica de Torrelavega.

In the first round of 2010–11, Rico found the net against Coruxo FC in a 3–2 home win. He scored a career-best six goals during the campaign, including one in the unsuccessful promotion playoffs.

Granada
On 5 August 2011, Rico left Castilla and signed for Granada CF, with Real Madrid retaining an option for the player in case of a future transfer. On 25 September, he scored his first La Liga goal in only his second league game for his new team: after replacing Moisés Hurtado at half-time, he netted the equaliser in an eventual 1–1 home draw with CA Osasuna.

In April 2012, Rico was sidelined for the rest of the season after suffering another injury to his right knee. He also missed the entirety of the following campaign.

Rico was an ever-present figure for the Andalusians in 2013–14, with his side narrowly avoiding relegation. On 26 February 2015, he renewed his contract with the club until 2020.

On 26 August 2016, Rico was loaned to fellow top-tier side SD Eibar for two years. He missed the entire 2017–18 season, due to the same ailment.

Returning to Granada for 2018–19, Rico only appeared in one league match during the campaign for the runners-up. On 16 July 2019, he terminated his contract.

After retiring, Rico worked with Eibar and Sporting de Gijón in directorial capacities.

Career statistics

References

External links

1987 births
Living people
People from O Salnés
Sportspeople from the Province of Pontevedra
Spanish footballers
Footballers from Galicia (Spain)
Association football midfielders
La Liga players
Segunda División players
Segunda División B players
Portonovo SD players
Pontevedra CF footballers
Real Madrid Castilla footballers
Granada CF footballers
SD Eibar footballers